Wernffrwd (Gwernffrwd) is a village in the south of Wales.

The village is situated in the north of the Gower Peninsula, overlooking the Loughor Estuary and consists of lower and upper Wernffrwd.  The majority of the houses can be found in the lower part of the village, as does the church of Saint David's which can be found on the marsh road which skirts the village.

Populated places on the Gower Peninsula
Villages in Swansea